Chanthaburi Airstrip  is an airport located in Tha Mai, Tha Mai District, Chanthaburi, Thailand.

References

Buildings and structures in Chanthaburi province
Airports in Thailand
Royal Thai Navy